Héctor Castro Castro (born 1933) is a Chilean politician who has served as ambassador and has worked for the Ministry of Foreign Affairs.

Biography

Early life
Castro Castro attended the Marist Institute of Quillota. Then, he joined the Pontifical Catholic University of Valparaíso to do his BA in laws, which he obtained in 1964.

In his university time, Castro Castro joined the Christian Democratic Party (PDC).

Political career
Before being deputy, he was Provincial Vice President at the PDC. Then, when he was 40 in 1973, Castro Castro was elected deputy for the 1973−1977 in representation of Imperial, Quillota, Limache and Casablanca. In that period, he was a member of the permanent commission on Labor and Social Security.

On 11 September 1973, his legislative period was suspended as a result of the 1973 military coup which overthrew Salvador Allende's government and suspended the 1925 Constitution.

References

Further reading
 Castillo Infante, Fernando (1996). «Diccionario Histórico y Biográfico de Chile». Santiago, Chile: Editorial Zig-Zag.
 Urzúa Valenzuela, Germán (1992). «Historia Política de Chile y su Evolución Electoral 1810-1992» (3.ª edición). Santiago, Chile: Editorial Jurídica de Chile.

External links
BCN Profile

1933 births

Possibly living people
20th-century Chilean politicians
Pontifical Catholic University of Valparaíso alumni
Christian Democratic Party (Chile) politicians
People from Quillota
Members of the Chamber of Deputies of Chile